Blaesia is a genus of beetle of the subfamily Cetoniinae in the family Scarabaeidae. Its two species are found in southern South America. It is one of two genera in the subtribe Blaesiina.

References

Cetoniinae
Beetles described in 1842
Taxa named by Hermann Burmeister
Scarabaeidae genera